Richard John Sutton (23 September 1938 – 17 April 2009) was a New Zealand legal academic and chess player. He was twice the dean of the Faculty of Law of the University of Otago and was the New Zealand national chess champion in 1962–63 and 1970–72.

Sutton was born in London, England. He earned BA and LLM degrees from Auckland University and an LLM from Harvard Law School. He was employed at the University of Auckland Law School and in 1980 became a full professor at the Faculty of Law of the University of Otago in Dunedin. At Otago, he served on two occasions as dean of the faculty. He became an emeritus professor in 2005.

Sutton became the New Zealand national chess champion in 1962. The final game against Ortvin Sarapu ended in a draw, so Sutton and Sarapu were declared co-champions. In 1970 and 1971, Sutton won the New Zealand championship outright. Sutton competed for New Zealand at a number of Chess Olympiads and in 1975 lost to Jørn Sloth in the final of the world championship of correspondence chess.

Sutton died of cancer in Dunedin.

References
"Legal scholar dies", Otago Daily Times, 2009-04-20
Richard Sutton 1938–2009, Otago Daily Times chess column, by Quentin Johnson, 5 May 2009.

External links
Richard John Sutton at chessgames.com
Emeritus Professor Richard Sutton, University of Otago

1938 births
2009 deaths
Deaths from cancer in New Zealand
English emigrants to New Zealand
Harvard Law School alumni
Law school deans
New Zealand legal scholars
New Zealand chess players
Lawyers from Dunedin
University of Auckland alumni
Academic staff of the University of Auckland
Academic staff of the University of Otago
20th-century chess players
Sportspeople from Dunedin